District V is the heart of Budapest and the political, financial, commercial and touristic center of Hungary. The name of the district is Belváros-Lipótváros (English: Inner City – Leopold Town), which refers to the two historical neighbourhoods that is located in the district; Belváros ("Inner City") and Lipótváros ("Leopold Town").
Inner City is the old town of Pest, while Leopold Town was established in the early 19th century, and became the political and financial centre of Hungary in the early 20th century when the Hungarian Parliament was built. The two neighbourhoods were originally the 4th (Inner City) and 5th (Leopold Town) districts of Budapest until 1950 when the two districts were merged and number IV was given to Újpest ("New Pest").

Today there is a coexisting larger definition of "inner city" (with lower case letters) which includes all of District V and some parts of District VI, District VII, District VIII, District IX and District XIII, and sometimes even some parts of the Buda side, however this larger definition is only colloquial.

The reason Inner City is not the 1st district, is that until 1873, Buda served as the capital city of Hungary, so it was obvious to start the numbering at the Buda Castle District. Districts on the Pest side received numbers from IV to X.

Location
The Inner City is situated in the Pest side, on the banks of the Danube.

Neighbours of District V are (clockwise from north):
Újlipótváros ("New Leopold Town") neighbourhood of the District XIII
District VI: Terézváros ("Theresa Town")
District VII: Erzsébetváros ("Elizabeth Town")
District VIII: Józsefváros ("Joseph Town")
District IX: Ferencváros ("Francis Town")
River Danube

Landmarks

Inner City
 Inner City Parish Church
 Váci Street
 Evangelical Church on Ferenc Deák Square
 Pilvax Café
Elisabeth Bridge
Leopold Town
 Hungarian Parliament Building
 St Stephen's Basilica
 Hungarian Academy of Sciences
 Széchenyi Chain Bridge
 Gresham Palace
 Vigadó Concert Hall
 Liberty Square
 Danube Promenade
 University Church
 U.S. Embassy
 Supreme Court 
 Ministry of Education
 Ministry of Youth
 Ethnographical Museum

Politics 
The current mayor of V. District of Budapest is Péter Szentgyörgyvölgyi (Fidesz).

The District Assembly, elected at the 2019 local government elections, is made up of 15 members (1 Mayor, 10 Individual constituencies MEPs and 4 Compensation List MEPs) divided into this political parties and alliances:

List of mayors

Twin towns
Belváros-Lipótváros is twinned with:
  Gyergyószentmiklós, Romania
  Old Town of Kraków, Poland
  Charlottenburg-Wilmersdorf of Berlin, Germany
  District II of Prague, Czech Republic
  Topolya, Serbia
  Torockó, Romania
  Ráhó, Ukraine
  Rozsnyó, Slovakia
  Énlaka, Romania

See also

Inner City
Lipótváros
List of districts in Budapest
List of tourist attractions in Budapest

Notes

References